Patricia Escobar de Arzú, (born October 3, 1953) also known as Patricia de Arzú, is a Salvadoran-Guatemalan entrepreneur and politician. She is the widow of Former President of Guatemala and mayor of Guatemala City Álvaro Arzú Irigoyen, having served as First Lady of Guatemala from January 14, 1996 to January 14, 2000 and as First Lady of Guatemala City from 1991 to 1996, and again from 2004 until his death in 2018. She was an unsuccessful presidential candidate in the 2011 elections for the Unionist Party.

Biography
Patricia Escobar de Arzú, was born on October 3, 1953 in the city of San Salvador. She married the former president of Guatemala Álvaro Arzú Irigoyen, with whom she had four children: María Andrée, Roberto Manuel, Alvaro and Isabel. She has 11 grandchildren. She graduated as a secretary in San Salvador, and studied business administration at the Broward Community School in Florida, United States, and philosophy at Rafael Landívar University in Guatemala. Her interest in improving the conditions for the most vulnerable in Guatemalan society has made her one best known women entrepreneurs in Guatemala. In 1987 she was founder and general coordinator of the Secretariat of Social Affairs of the Municipality of Guatemala, which allowed her to create three children's gardens that continue to offer their services after 20 years.

Arzú ran as a candidate for president in the 2011 elections. She was 8th out of 10 candidates, with a total of 97,277 votes representing 2.19% of the total votes. She is the mother of politician Álvaro Arzú Escobar, former president of the Congress.

References 

1953 births
First ladies of Guatemala
Living people
People from Guatemala City
Guatemalan people of Salvadoran descent
Salvadoran emigrants to Guatemala
Arzú family